The 2002 Tour de Langkawi was the 7th edition of the Tour de Langkawi, a cycling stage race that took place in Malaysia. It started on 1 February in Putrajaya and ended on 10 February in Kuala Lumpur. In fact, this race was rated by the Union Cycliste Internationale (UCI) as a 2.3 category race.

Hernán Darío Muñoz of Colombia won the race. Robert Hunter of South Africa won the point classification and Ruber Marín of Colombia won the mountains classification.  won the team classification.

Stages
The cyclists competed in 10 stages, covering a distance of 1,312.6 kilometres.

Classification leadership

Final standings

General classification

Points classification

Mountains classification

Asian rider classification

Team classification

Asian team classification

List of teams and riders
A total of 22 teams were invited to participate in the 2002 Tour de Langkawi. Out of the 151 riders, a total of 128 riders made it to the finish in Kuala Lumpur.

 
  Paolo Lanfranchi
  Marco Battiston
  Alberto Elli
  Daniele Galli
  Antonio Salomone
  Eddy Serri
  Andris Reiss
 
  Andrea Tafi
  Davide Bramati
  Paolo Fornaciari
  Robert Hunter
  Charly Wegelius
  Luca Scinto
  David Cañada
 
  Jens Voigt
  Yohann Charpenteau
  Christophe Le Mével
  Ludovic Martin
  Benoît Poilvet
  Yan Tournier
 
  Kyrylo Pospyeyev
  Michele Scarponi
  Rubén Lobato
  Agustin Pena Gago
  Cesare Di Cintio
  Lorenzo Cardellini
 
  Linas Balčiūnas
  Laurent Estadieu
  Andy Flickinger
  Alexandre Grux
  Nicolas Inaudi
  Innar Mändoja
  Nicolas Portal
 
  Nathan O'Neill
  Nicola Chesini
  Enrico Degano
  Stefano Guerrini
  Sergiy Matveyev
  Graeme Brown
  Cristiano Parrinello

 
  Mario Aerts
  Frédéric Amorison
  Kurt van Lancker
  Kevin van Impe
  Fulco van Gulik
  Stive Vermaut
  Wesley van Speybroeck
 Telekom Malaysia
  Graeme Miller
  Wong Kam-po
  Ghader Mizbani
  Ahad Kazemi
  Tonton Susanto
  Mohamad Fauzi Shafihi
  Nor Affendy Rosli
 
  Max Becker
  Tony Bracke
  Eric De Clercq
  Hans De Meester
  Björn Leukemans
  Karl Pauwels
  Hendrik Van Dyck
 
  Mario Traversoni
  Moreno Di Biase
  Alessandro Brendolin
  Samuel Vecchi
  Antoni Rizzi
  Uros Murn
  Denis Bondarenko
 
  Jorge Capitan Peregrina
  David Fernández Domingo
  César Garcia Calvo
  Oscar Laguna Garcia
  German Nieto Fernandez
  David Vazquez Garcia
  José Manuel Vázquez Palomo
 Team Fakta
  Lennie Kristensen
  Morten Sonne
  Bjørnar Vestøl
  René Jørgensen
  Jorgen Bo Petersen
  Lars Bak
  Allan Bo Andresen

 
  Anthony Charteau
  Anthony Geslin
  Charles Guilbert
  Jimmy Engoulvent
  Mickaël Pichon
  Jérôme Pineau
  Thomas Voeckler
 Malaysia
  Shahrulneeza Razali
  Tsen Seong Hoong
  Mohd Yusof Abd. Nasir
  Muhd. Jasmin Ruslan
  Shahrizan Selamat
  Wong Ah Thiam
  Suhardi Hassan
 
  Hernán Darío Muñoz
  Juan Diego Ramírez
  Fortunato Baliani
  Andris Naudužs
  Leonardo Scarselli
  Mikhaylo Khalilov
  Ruber Marín
 Nürnberger
  Artour Babaitsev
  Ronny Lauke
  Jürgen Pauritsch
  Dirk Schumann
  Holger Sievers
  Lubor Tesar
  Jurgen Werner
 iTeamNova.com
  Jamie Drew
  Russell Downing
  Scott Guyton
  Dominique Perras
  Brett Lancaster
  Trent Wilson
  Allan Iacuone

 South Africa
  Douglas Ryder
  David George
  Rodney Green
  Daniel Spence
  Jacques Fullard
  James Ball
  Jeremy Maartens
 Philippines
  Victor Espiritu
  Warren Davadilla
  Arnel Quirimit
  Enrique Domingo
  Merculio Ramos
  Villamor Baluyut
  Emilito Atilano
 Japan
  Makoto Iijima
  Koji Fukushima
  Shinichi Fukushima
  Tomoya Kano
  Mitsuteru Tanaka
  Kazuya Okazaki
  Shinri Suzuki
 Canada
  Glan Rendall
  Mark Ernsting
  Andrew Pinfold
  Geoff Kabush
  Josh Hall
  Eric Wohlberg
  Ryder Hesjedal
 China
  Hui Guo
  Wang Guozhang
  Song Shuhai
  Li Hongwei
  Zhu Yongbiao
  Jiang Xueli

References

2002
2002 in road cycling
2002 in Malaysian sport